These tours were the third tours as the trio of Crosby, Stills & Nash, without Neil Young. They were in support of the 1982 album Daylight Again, and the 1983 live album Allies.

History 
This was their first tour in 4 years, supporting their newest album Daylight Again. This was also the first time CSN toured Europe, since two dates back in 1970.

Personnel 

 David Crosby — vocals, guitars
 Stephen Stills — vocals, guitars, keyboards
 Graham Nash — vocals, guitars, organ
 Michael Sturgis  — Guitar
 Mike Finnigan — Keyboards
 Efrain Toro — Percussion
 George "Chocolate" Perry — Bass 1982 tour
Joe Vitale — Drums 1982 tour
 Kim Bullard — Keyboards 1983 tour
 James Newton Howard — Keyboards 1982 tour
 Kenny Passarelli — Bass 1983 tour
 Rick Jaeger — Drums 1983 tour

Setlists 
A typical set list for the 1982 tour included the following, although there were substitutions, variations and order switches throughout the tour.

 "Love The One You're With" (Stills)
 "Turn Your Back On Love"  (Stills, Nash)
 "The Lee Shore"  (Crosby)
 "Just A Song Before I Go" (Nash)
 "Chicago" (Nash)
 "Barrel Of Pain (Half-Life)"  (Nash)
 "To The Last Whale..." (Crosby, Nash)
 "Southern Cross" (Stills)
 "See The Changes" (Stills)
 "Long Time Gone"  (Crosby)
 "You Don't Have To Cry' (Stills)
 "Darkstar" (Stills)
 "Blackbird" (Lennon/McCartney)
 "Wasted On The Way"  (Nash)
 "Delta" (Crosby)
 "Guinevere" (Crosby)
 "Wooden Ships" (Crosby, Stills, Kantner)
 "Suite: Judy Blues Eyes" (Stills)
 "Cathedral" (Nash)
 "For What It's Worth" (Stills)
 "Carry On" (Stills)
 "Teach Your Children" (Nash)

1982 Tour Dates

1983 Tour dates

References 

 
1982 concert tours
1983 concert tours